Archaruniq was a region and family of the old Armenia  300–800.

See also
List of regions of ancient Armenia

Early medieval Armenian regions